Sword of Honour is a trilogy of novels by Evelyn Waugh, set during the Second World War.

Sword of Honour may also refer to:

Media
 Sword of Honour (1939 film), a British drama film
 Sword of Honour (2001 film), a British television film based on the novel series, with a script by William Boyd
 Sword of Honour (Australian TV series), a 1986 Australian miniseries
 Sword of Honour (video game), a 1992 game developed by Dynafield Systems for Amiga, Commodore 64 and PC DOS systems
 Kirpaan: The Sword of Honour, a 2014 Punjabi film

Military and martial awards
 One of the Weapons of Honour awarded by France
 Sword of Honour (Cranwell), awarded to cadets at the Royal Air Force College Cranwell
 Sword of Honour (Duntroon), awarded to cadets at the Royal Military College, Duntroon, Australia
 Sword of Honour (New Zealand), an honour bestowed by Queen Victoria upon six Māori chieftains for service during the 1865–70 New Zealand Land Wars
 Sword of Honour (Pakistan), awarded to the best cadets at the Pakistan military academies
 Sword of Honour (Sandhurst), awarded to the best cadet at the Royal Military Academy Sandhurst, United Kingdom
 The honour swords that Lloyd's Patriotic Fund awarded between 1803 and 1809 to British Naval and Marine officers for courageous conduct
 Sword of Honour (HEMA), the trophy awarded at the annual jousting tournament of the British Armouries Museum